As with many large cities, a large number of Boston-area streetcar lines once existed, and many continued operating into the 1950s. However, only a few now remain, namely the four branches of the Green Line and the Ashmont–Mattapan High-Speed Line, with only one (the Green Line E branch) running regular service on an undivided street.

History
The first streetcar line in the Boston area was a horse-drawn line from Central Square, Cambridge to Bowdoin Square, Boston opened by the Cambridge Railroad on March 26, 1856. Over the following decade a large number of horsecar lines were built by different companies, including the Metropolitan Railroad, Middlesex Railroad, and South Boston Railroad; these companies competed with each other while also sharing tracks in many locations. By the mid-1860s horsecar lines reached to Lynn, Arlington, Watertown, Newton, West Roxbury, and Milton. In 1887 the various Boston-area horsecar companies (except for the Lynn and Boston Railroad) were all consolidated into the West End Street Railway.

In 1889 the West End Street Railway experimented with electric power for its streetcars; the results were so promising that it abandoned a cable car project already under construction. Several lines were electrified in 1889 and by 1895 almost the entire system had been electrified. The last horsecar line was abandoned in 1900.

In 1897 the recently-formed Boston Elevated Railway (BERy) took over the West End Street Railway in order to make the streetcar lines part of its planned rapid transit system. In 1897 the Tremont Street Subway opened and many streetcar routes that had previously used surface tracks in downtown Boston were rerouted into the subway. Over the following decades the opening elevated and underground rapid transit lines (which became today's Orange Line and Red Line), as well as extensions of the Tremont Street subway (which became the Green Line), allowed progressively more streetcar lines to be removed from the congested streets downtown and rerouted to rapid transit stations further out. Passengers could transfer for free between streetcars and rapid transit lines to complete their journeys to or from downtown. In 1904 the East Boston Tunnel opened and was initially used to allow streetcars from East Boston to reach downtown, but in 1924 it was converted into another rapid transit line (part of today's Blue Line) operated with free transfers to and from streetcars at Maverick station.

In the 1920s as competition from cars increased and bus technology improved, the BERy began replacing some of its streetcar lines with buses. These conversions accelerated in the 1930s, with some routes also converted to trolleybuses (locally referred to as 'trackless trolleys'). Bus conversions paused during World War II when gasoline and rubber were in limited supply, but resumed in the late 1940s.

In 1947 the Metropolitan Transit Authority (MTA) was formed to take over the streetcar, bus, and rapid transit operations of the Boston Elevated Railway. It continued to convert lines from streetcar (and trackless trolley) to bus. In 1964 the MTA's operations were in turn taken over by the Massachusetts Bay Transportation Authority (MBTA), which also took over other bus systems running to suburban towns outside the MTA area. By this point the only remaining streetcar lines were five routes running into the Tremont Street Subway and one route on private right-of-way between Mattapan and Ashmont at the end of the Red Line. These were respectively designated as the Green Line branches A thru E and as part of the Red Line. The Green Line "A" branch was subsequently abandoned in 1969 and the "E" branch south of Heath Street abandoned in 1985.

Route numbering
In 1936, the BERy assigned numbers to its routes for map use, but route numbers were not used on buses until the late 1960s (when the colors were assigned to the remaining rail lines). Additionally, the numbers were only kept the same on and after the 1942 revision of the map; before that they were changed with each new version. A few routes were renumbered around 1967, but most routes have kept their original numbers even through conversions from streetcar to trackless trolley to bus. Routes were numbered roughly clockwise from South Boston to East Boston.

Timeline of streetcar abandonments
This is a table of when each streetcar line was converted to trackless trolley or bus.  Only information post-1940 is complete.

MTA streetcar routes as of 1953

As of early 1953 the Metropolitan Transit Authority operated the following streetcar routes. All lines were connected via trackage to the Tremont Street subway (Green Line), but only the 9, 39, 43, 57, 61, 62 and 69 actually operated in the subway.

Eastern Massachusetts Street Railway routes
The Eastern Massachusetts Street Railway (EMSR) operated lines between Boston and towns north and south of the Boston area, including Lynn, Salem, Reading, Lowell, Lawrence, Quincy, Hingham, and Brockton. It also operated local streetcar service within those towns. The company was formed in 1919 to take over the lines of the bankrupt Bay State Street Railway, which advertised itself as "the world's largest street railway system" in the 1910s. Between 1931 and 1937, EMSR replaced almost all of its streetcar routes with bus service. Only three streetcar lines were left by the end of 1937, all linking Boston to nearby towns.

Stoneham–Sullivan
This streetcar line ran between Sullivan Square#Elevated station and Stoneham, Massachusetts. It left Sullivan operated by a Boston Elevated Railway driver and ran via the tracks of BERy's 100 line. It continued beyond from the north end of the 100 through the Middlesex Fells on a privateright-of-way west of Fellsway West. At a stop called "Sheepfold" near Spot Pond in Middlesex Fells, the operator was replaced by an EMSR employee who drove the streetcar the rest of the way into Stoneham and alongside Main Street to the terminal at Farm Hill Station of the Boston and Maine Railroad Stoneham Branch.

The line was bustituted in 1946. In 1968 the MBTA took the bus service over as the 430, and from March 1969 to the end of its service in September 1971, it was part of the 100A Reading–Sullivan via Main Street and Fellsway.

Quincy routes
Two Quincy routes left Fields Corner station, running to Quincy center and then splitting. One line continued to Hough's Neck, and the other to Quincy Point and the Fore River Shipyard. The lines were bustituted in 1946 and 1948 respectively.

See also
 Middlesex and Boston Street Railway
 Eastern Massachusetts Street Railway

References

 Carlson et al. (1986), The Colorful Streetcars We Rode, Bulletin 125 of the Central Electric Railfans' Association, Chicago, Il. 
Changes to Transit Service in the MBTA District 1964-Present (PDF)
m00209, MBTA Green Line -- unused tunnel at Boylston station, rec.railroad May 5, 1994
RTSPCC, Boston Trolleys, misc.transport.urban-transit June 4, 1998
TIMEPOINTS VOL 3 NO 2 August 1951
Trackless Trolley Routes
rtspcc, More Boston streetcar questions, ne.transportation May 20, 2005
 Boston Transit Routes, chicagorailfan.com
 Boston Elevated Railway system maps: 1930 1936 1937 1940 1943 1946

Streetcars in the Boston area